Deep-Sky Planner is observation planning and logging software for amateur astronomers. It helps observers to determine where and when to view all types of celestial objects. It runs on Windows.

Deep-Sky Planner was originally published April 1, 1994 by Sky Publishing Corporation. Knightware, LLC began publishing Deep-Sky Planner in 2005. Subsequent versions have been released to present.

Deep-Sky Planner received best astronomy product of the year awards in 2013 from Astronomy magazine and in 2014 from Sky & Telescope magazine.
The software is developed and distributed by Knightware, LLC.

Features 

 Large database of celestial objects including the Revised New General Catalog & Index Catalog by Wolfgang Steinicke
 Search, sort, filter and report objects in the database
 Compute accurate planet, asteroid and comet positions
 Control GoTo telescopes via ASCOM
 Planetarium program inter-operation with:
 TheSky (astronomy software)
 Starry Night (planetarium software)
 RedShift (planetarium software)
 Cartes du Ciel
 Stellarium (software)
 Integrated observing log that supports OpenAstronomyLog
 Insert readings from Unihedron's Sky Quality Meter into observing log
 Display and manage images from Digitized Sky Survey
 Online library of observing lists (plans)

See also 
List of software for astronomy research and education
Marble (software)
Shadows (software)

References

External links 
 Knightware, LLC
 OpenAstronomyLog web site

Astronomy software
Science software for Windows